A coast guard academy is a military academy that trains members of a coast guard, typically at the national level.

Examples of coast guard academies include: 

Canadian Coast Guard College, founded in 1965, based in Westmount, Nova Scotia
Border and Coast Guard Academy, Finland
Indian Coast Guard Academy, currently under construction in Azhikkal, Kannur, Kerala
Japan Coast Guard Academy, founded in 1951, based in Kure, Hiroshima
Korea Maritime and Ocean University established in November 1945, based in Busan
United States Coast Guard Academy, founded in 1876, based in New London, Connecticut